Grenola is a city in Elk County, Kansas, United States.  As of the 2020 census, the population of the city was 151.

History
Grenola had its start in the year 1879 by the building of the railroad through that territory. At that time, the two rival cities of Green Field and Canola, which were three miles apart, relocated to the site of the railroad and merged. The name Grenola is a portmanteau of the names of the two former towns.

Geography
Grenola is located at  (37.3486427, -96.4505641).

Climate
The climate in this area is characterized by hot, humid summers and generally mild to cool winters.  According to the Köppen Climate Classification system, Grenola has a humid subtropical climate, abbreviated "Cfa" on climate maps.

Demographics

2010 census
As of the census of 2010, there were 216 people, 92 households, and 64 families residing in the city. The racial makeup of the city was 97.7% White, 1.9% Asian, and 0.5% from two or more races.

There were 92 households, of which 25.0% had children under the age of 18 living with them, 51.1% were married couples living together, 15.2% had a female householder with no husband present, 3.3% had a male householder with no wife present, and 30.4% were non-families. 27.2% of all households were made up of individuals, and 13% had someone living alone who was 65 years of age or older. The average household size was 2.35 and the average family size was 2.80.

The median age in the city was 47.4 years. 25% of residents were under the age of 18; 3.7% were between the ages of 18 and 24; 18.5% were from 25 to 44; 25.8% were from 45 to 64; and 26.9% were 65 years of age or older. The gender makeup of the city was 49.5% male and 50.5% female.

2000 census
As of the census of 2000, there were 231 people, 102 households, and 68 families residing in the city. The racial makeup of the city was 95.24% White, 0.43% Native American, 0.43% Pacific Islander, 2.60% from other races, and 1.30% from two or more races. Hispanic or Latino of any race were 2.60% of the population.

There were 102 households, out of which 20.6% had children under the age of 18 living with them, 57.8% were married couples living together, 7.8% had a female householder with no husband present, and 33.3% were non-families. 29.4% of all households were made up of individuals, and 14.7% had someone living alone who was 65 years of age or older. The average household size was 2.26 and the average family size was 2.76.

In the city, the population was spread out, with 20.3% under the age of 18, 6.9% from 18 to 24, 22.5% from 25 to 44, 26.4% from 45 to 64, and 23.8% who were 65 years of age or older. The median age was 45 years. For every 100 females, there were 83.3 males. For every 100 females age 18 and over, there were 85.9 males.

The median income for a household in the city was $23,000, and the median income for a family was $30,417. Males had a median income of $20,313 versus $16,250 for females. The per capita income for the city was $13,068. About 7.2% of families and 10.0% of the population were below the poverty line, including 3.9% of those under the age of eighteen and 19.6% of those 65 or over.

Education
The community is served by Central USD 462 public school district. The Central High School mascot is Central Raiders.

Notable people
 Trixie Friganza (1870-1955), American actress, Touring Theatre (1889-1917), Vaudeville (1906–1932), Film (1923-1940), born Delia O'Callaghan in Grenola
 Jake L. Hamon Sr. (1873–1920), attorney, oil millionaire, railway owner, political figure, born in Grenola.

See also
 Caney River
 Grenola Mill and Elevator
 South Kansas and Oklahoma Railroad

References

Further reading

External links
 City of Grenola
 Grenola - Directory of Public Officials
 Grenola city map, KDOT

Cities in Kansas
Cities in Elk County, Kansas
Populated places established in 1879